The Institut Saint-Luc is an arts school in Brussels, Belgium. It consists of six departments, with a total of 2,200 students and 430 employees, spread over five locations in Ixelles and Saint-Gilles.

History
The school was founded by members of the Institute of the Brothers of the Christian Schools, a French order created in 1680 by Jean-Baptiste de la Salle in France. Different Saint-Luc institutes were founded all over Belgium with the first in Ghent in 1863. The first school in Brussels was founded in 1882 in Molenbeek and then was later relocated to Schaerbeek in 1887. Work began in 1904 for a new institute in Saint-Gilles, then called the Institut Jean Béthune, and had only 14 students. Construction finished four years later in 1908. The location is currently still in use and underwent renovations and expansions in 1995.

Organisation
The school (called both Institut and Instituts, depending on the point of view) is divided into six departments:
ESA, the École Supérieure des Arts (Higher School of Arts), with 700 students: studies include a bachelor's (three years), a master's (one additional year), and a specialized master's (one additional year).
ERG, the École de Recherche Graphique(School for Graphical Research), with 420 students: studies include a bachelor's (three years), master's (one additional year), and specialized master's (one additional year).
ISURU, the Institute Supérieure d'Urbanisme et de Rénovation Urbaine (Higher Institute for Urbanism and Urban Renovation), with 85 students: created in 1947, is a post-graduate school with a three-year course (evening studies).
ISES, The Institut Saint-Luc d'Enseignement Secondaire (Saint-Luc Secondary School), with 610 students.
EPS, the École de Promotion Sociale (School for Social Promotion), with 340 students.

The comics division
In 1969, comics artist Eddy Paape, who had worked for 20 years for the two leading Franco-Belgian comics magazines Spirou and Tintin, started a course in comics, with the support of Hergé, an alumnus of the Institut. It was the first of its kind in Belgium and was soon developed into a full bachelor's program.  Eddy Paape was followed by Claude Renard in 1976. The course soon become a well-known breeding ground for new Belgian talent. From 1975 and on, the program produced the magazine Le 9ème rêve (The 9th Dream, a reference commonly used in Belgium and France describing comics as the ninth art form). In 1978, the magazine received the Award for the best promotion of comics from the French Angoulême International Comics Festival. François Schuiten, an alumni, also taught at the school. Between 1984 and 2006, 286 students received a Bachelor's in Comics.

About 50% of the students later work in the comics industry.

Notable alumni
Kitty Crowther
Jean-Michel Folon
André Franquin
Hergé
Philippe Lafontaine
Xavier Lust
Midam
Eddy Paape
Guy Peellaert
Picha
Benoît Poelvoorde
Stephan Vanfleteren

Alumni from the architecture division
Francis Bonaert

Alumni from the comics division
Andreas
Jo-El Azara
Pierre Bailly
Philippe Berthet
Frédéric Bézian
Antonio Cossu
Denis Deprez
Chantal de Spiegeleer
Franz Drappier
Philippe Francq
Pascal Garray
André Geerts
Alain Goffin
Bernard Hislaire
Ilan Manouach
Jean-David Morvan
Frank Pé
Plantu
François Schuiten
Benoît Sokal
Yves Swolfs

Notes

External links
Homepage
Homepage of EPS
Homepage of ERG
Homepage of ESA
Homepage of ISURU
Homepage of SEC
Interview in ActuaBD for the 30 years of the Comics department

1904 establishments in Belgium
Art schools in Belgium
Belgian comics
Schools in Brussels
Architecture schools
Ixelles
Saint-Gilles, Belgium